The Puppy's Further Adventures (originally titled The Puppy's New Adventures for season one) is a 30-minute Saturday morning animated series produced by Ruby-Spears Enterprises (in association with Hanna-Barbera Productions for its first season only) and broadcast on ABC from September 25, 1982 to November 10, 1984. It is based on characters created by Jane Thayer about Petey, a young dog who attached himself to a lonely orphan boy named Tommy.

Overview 
Petey the puppy was originally introduced in four half-hour television specials which aired as part of ABC Weekend Specials series from 1978 to 1981: The Puppy Who Wanted a Boy, The Puppy's Great Adventure, The Puppy's Amazing Rescue and The Puppy Saves the Circus.

The Puppy Who Wanted a Boy and its three sequels were frequently rebroadcast on ABC Weekend Specials and proved so popular with its annual replays that ABC commissioned a television series. In September 1982, Petey could be seen weekly in The Puppy's New Adventures as part of the second half of The Scooby & Scrappy-Doo/Puppy Hour block with Billy Jacoby voicing Petey and Nancy McKeon as his female puppy girlfriend Dolly. The following year, Petey and his pals were given their own half-hour timeslot in a follow-up series under the new title The Puppy's Further Adventures. Following the show's original run, a repackaging of both seasons were shown in reruns under the title The Puppy's Great Adventures on ABC in 1984 and resurfaced on CBS in 1986.

Characters 
 Petey (voiced by Billy Jacoby): A Beagle mix puppy who is the young leader of the group and whose loyal and loving girlfriend is Dolly.
 Dolly (voiced by Nancy McKeon): A female Spaniel Cross puppy who is cheerful and outgoing and is also Petey's girlfriend. She is the only female in the group.
 Duke (voiced by Michael Bell): A German Shepherd/Labrador Retriever mix who is the lancer of the group; he cares for Petey and his other friends.
 Dash (voiced by Michael Bell): A Greyhound who is sleek and speedy and the smartest member of the group, but can be cowardly at times, although he can be brave if he wants to.
 Lucky (voiced by Peter Cullen): A St. Bernard who is the big guy of the group; he is strong, kind and wise, but not too bright.
 Glyder(voiced by Josh Rodine): A puppy whose large ears enabled him to fly. He only appeared in three episodes.
 Tommy: Petey and Dolly's original owner. Petey and his fellow dogs were reunited with him and his parents in 1983.
 Tommy's father and mother.

Episodes

ABC Weekend Specials (1978–81) 
The Puppy was originally introduced in four half-hour television specials which aired as part of ABC Weekend Specials.

The Puppy's New Adventures (1982) 
The first season featured Petey and Dolly's family moving overseas by ship; their friends Duke, Dash and Lucky stowed away on the same ship. All five dogs were stranded together when a lightning bolt knocked them overboard. Every episode consisted of the dogs looking for Tommy and his family, winding up in places as diverse as East Berlin, Australia, Hong Kong, Hawaii and usually helping out a local group of people or animals.

The Puppy's Further Adventures (1983) 
The second season opened with a two-part episode in which the dogs are finally reunited with Tommy's family. The rest of the season featured the dogs' adventures with the family while travelling all around the United States. The season opener introduced Glyder, a puppy with ears so large he could fly like Dumbo. Glyder re-appeared in two other episodes.

Broadcast history 
The Puppy series was originally broadcast in these following formats on ABC and CBS:
 The Puppy's New Adventures (September 25, 1982 – September 3, 1983, ABC) (as part of The Scooby & Scrappy-Doo/Puppy Hour)
 The Puppy's Further Adventures (September 10, 1983 – September 1, 1984, ABC)
 The Puppy's Great Adventures (September 8, 1984 – November 10, 1984, ABC; September 13, 1986 – November 8, 1986, CBS)

Voices 
 Billy Jacoby as Petey
 Michael Bell as Dash and Duke
 Peter Cullen as Lucky
 Nancy McKeon as Dolly

Additional voices 

 Dick Beals
 Virginia Christine
 Cathleen Cordell
 Dave Coulier
 Jack DeLeon
 Alan Dinehart
 Hector Elias
 Michael Evans
 Al Fann
 Bernard Fox
 Alejandro Garay
 Linda Gary
 Kelly Glen
 Johnny Haymer
 Bob Holt
 Greg LaStrapes
 Keye Luke

 Chuck McCann
 Julio Medina
 Tonyo Melendez
 Tony O'Dell
 Alan Oppenheimer
 Pat Parris
 Evan Richards
 Josh Roone
 Neil Ross
 Bill Scott
 Joe Silver
 John Stephenson
 Larry Storch
 Janet Waldo
 Frank Welker
 Alan Young

Merchandising 
 The Puppy's New Adventures stuffed animal toys of Petey and Dolly manufactured by Etone International (1982) 
 A series of three children's literature books by Antioch Publishing Company (1983):
 The Puppy's New Adventures: ABC with Petey and His Friends (A Little Shape book)
 The Puppy's New Adventures: Hide and Seek (A What's Inside? Pop-Open book)
 The Puppy's New Adventures: The Puppy Who Wanted a Boy (A Collector book with stickers)
 A 15-piece jigsaw puzzle of The Puppy's Further Adventures by Playskool titled "Tommy's Circus Act" featuring Tommy, Petey and Dolly (1983)
 A Milton Bradley board game titled The Puppy's Further Adventures Game for 2 to 4 players, ages 5 to 10 (1984)
 A collection of four 25-piece frame-tray puzzles of The Puppy's Further Adventures by Milton Bradley featuring Petey, Dolly, Duke, Dash, Lucky and Glyder (1984)
 The Puppy's Further Adventures 80-piece jigsaw puzzle by Hestair Puzzles (UK, 1984)
 The Puppy's Great Adventures coloring book by Western Publishing (1985)
 A French language 7" vinyl single of The Puppy's Further Adventures titled "Les Poupies" (sung by Véronique Bodoin) by Polydor Records (France, 1985)

In other languages 
 
 
 
 Brazilian Portuguese: As Aventuras de Puppy

References

External links 
 
 
 

1982 American television series debuts
1984 American television series endings
1980s American animated television series
American children's animated adventure television series
American Broadcasting Company original programming
CBS original programming
Animated television series about dogs
American television shows based on children's books
Television series by Ruby-Spears
ABC Weekend Special